Giuseppe Grassi (8 May 1883 in Martano – 25 August 1950) was a 20th-century Italian politician. Member of the Italian Liberal Party, he served as Minister of Justice in Alcide De Gasperi's fourth and fifth cabinets between 1947 and 1950. He signed, as Keeper of the Seals, the Constitution of Italy in 1948.

Biography
Giuseppe Grassi was born of noble origins: Grassi was an ancient family of 1100 AD derived from William VI, Duke of Aquitaine (descendant of one of the twelve sons of Tancred of Hauteville) and was a feudal lord of Alessano under King William II of Sicily. The original family from Otranto branched out and enjoyed nobility with the predicate of Martano (Lecce). Giuseppe was adopted by his uncle Prince Sebastiano (brother of his mother who died very young) and added to his surname that of Apostolico Orsini Ducas. He was the son of Michelina Apostolico and Pasquale.

His cultural training originated in the Argento college of Lecce, where he studied within the Society of Jesus, following in the footsteps of the Apostolic family. Son of the evolutionary process of Lecce's political Catholicism, his intellectual maturation was of a liberal type. He then studied law at the University of Rome, where he developed a passion for politics and an interest in research in the field of public law. He graduated in 1905 with a thesis in constitutional law.

In 1907 Grassi married Isabella Carissimo, with whom he would later have four children: Mary, Guglielmo, Fabio and Vittoria.

He hosted the Savoy family in his estate in Materdomini before exile.

References

1883 births
1950 deaths
People from the Province of Lecce
Italian Liberal Party politicians
Italian Ministers of Justice
Deputies of Legislature XXIV of the Kingdom of Italy
Deputies of Legislature XXV of the Kingdom of Italy
Deputies of Legislature XXVI of the Kingdom of Italy
Members of the National Council (Italy)
Members of the Constituent Assembly of Italy
Deputies of Legislature I of Italy
Politicians of Apulia